Volcanism of Western Canada has produced lava flows, lava plateaus, lava domes, cinder cones, stratovolcanoes, shield volcanoes, greenstone belts, submarine volcanoes, calderas, diatremes and maars, along with examples of more less common volcanic forms such as tuyas and subglacial mounds.

Volcanic belts

External links
 Erica A. Massey: A Comparative Study of Glaciovolcanic Palagonitization of Tholeitic and Alkaline Sideromelane in Helgafell, Icland, and Wells Gray-Clearwater Volcanic Filed, BC, Canada. B.Sc., The University of British Columbia, 2014

Volcanic fields

See also

References
Volcanoes of Canada

 
.
.
.
.